Lasho (Geʽez: ላሾ) is a town in Wolayita Zone of the Southern Nations, Nationalities, and Peoples' Region, Ethiopia. The approximate distance from the town of Sodo to Lasho is about 79 kilometres to Northwest via B52. And also the distance from Addis Ababa to Bombe is 388 km via Butajira-Worabe-Sodo to Southwest. Lasho town is used as an administrative capital of Kawo Koysha woreda of Wolaita Zone. It is located at an elevation of 2,130 meters above sea level. Lasho is a populated place in Southern Nations Nationalities and Peoples regional state. The amenities in the town are 24 hours electric light, pure water service, kindergarten, primary and high schools, health center, everyday public market and others. Lasho lies between about 6°42'29"North 37°28'23"East

References

Wolayita
Populated places in the Southern Nations, Nationalities, and Peoples' Region
Cities and towns in Wolayita Zone